Jeffrey Ian "Jeff" Mackintosh (January 22, 1971 – September 24, 2016) was a game designer who worked primarily on role-playing games.

Early life
Jeffrey Ian Mackintosh was born in 1971, the son of Ian and Dorothy Mackintosh.

Career
Jeff Mackintosh joined the Big Eyes, Small Mouth team at Guardians of Order in late 1999, and did the full color layouts for the second edition (2000) of the core rules. Guardians' super-hero RPG, Silver Age Sentinels (2002), was written by Mark C. MacKinnon, Mackintosh and Jesse Scoble. Graphic designer Adam Jury took over work on the licensed BESM books from Mackintosh in 2002.

Jeff Mackintosh died from glioblastoma multiforme on September 24, 2016.

References

External links
 Home page
 Jeff Mackintosh :: Pen & Paper RPG Database archive
 Remembering Jeff Mackintosh

1971 births
2016 deaths
Canadian game designers
Deaths from brain cancer in Canada
Deaths from glioblastoma
Role-playing game designers